N58 may refer to:

Roads 
 N58 road (Ireland)
 Santa Rosa–Tarlac Road, in the Philippines
 Nebraska Highway 58, in the United States

Other uses 
 N58 (Long Island bus)
 , a submarine of the Royal Navy
 Tiger Field, in Lyon County, Nevada, United States